The Reincarnation of Luna is a 2001 studio album by industrial disco band My Life with the Thrill Kill Kult.

Recording
The Reincarnation of Luna was recorded and mixed at Starlust Studios, Los Angeles.

Release
The Reincarnation of Luna was originally released by SleazeBox Records in 2001. It was later re-recorded and remixed for a 2007 release on Rykodisc under the name The Resurrection of Luna with the additional tracks "Ocean of Hate", "Hallowed Be My Name" and "Temptation Serenade (Remix)".

Track listing

Credits
 Artwork – McCoy, Mann
 Mastered by – Chris Greene
 Performer – The Bomb Gang Girlz, Thrill Kill Kult
 Producer – Buzz McCoy
 Written by – Buzz McCoy, Groovie Mann

References

External links

2001 albums
My Life with the Thrill Kill Kult albums